The Ibis Summer Dash (Japanese アイビスサマーダッシュ) is a Grade 3 horse race for Thoroughbreds aged three and over, run in July over a distance of 1000 metres on turf at Niigata Racecourse.

The race was first run in 2001 and has held Grade 3 status ever since. As of 2022, it is the only Graded Race in Japan with only the straight line course.

Winners since 2001

See also
 Horse racing in Japan
 List of Japanese flat horse races

References

Turf races in Japan